Maxwell Ruml (born 15 March 1997) is a speedway rider from the United States.

Speedway career 
Ruml became North American champion in 2020. He then followed it up by winning the USA National Speedway Championship in 2021.

He rode in the SGB Championship 2018 of British Speedway in 2018, riding for Edinburgh Monarchs.

He is the older brother of fellow Speedway rider Dillon Ruml.

References 

1997 births
Living people
American speedway riders
Edinburgh Monarchs riders
Sportspeople from Orange, California